Gypsy is a 2011 Slovakian drama film directed by Martin Šulík. The film was selected as the Slovak entry for the Best Foreign Language Film at the 84th Academy Awards, but it did not make the final shortlist.

Plot summary

Cast
 Miroslav Gulyas as Uncle
 Martina Kotlarova as Julka
 Jan Mizigar as Adam
 Attila Mokos as Priest

Releases, awards and nominations
In July 2011, the film was first released at the 46th Karlovy Vary International Film Festival, where it was nominated for the Crystal Globe, it won the Special Jury Prize, the Don Quijote Award, the Label Europa Cinemas award, and Jan Mizigar received a Special Mention for his role in the film. Thereafter it won 6 more awards and 9 nominations in various international film festivals.

See also
 List of submissions to the 84th Academy Awards for Best Foreign Language Film
 List of Slovak submissions for the Academy Award for Best Foreign Language Film

References

External links
 
 

2011 films
Films directed by Martin Šulík
Slovak drama films
Slovak-language films
Romani-language films
Czech drama films
2011 drama films
Sun in a Net Awards winners (films)